The following is the list of episodes for the Japanese anime, Kure-nai. The anime is produced by Brains Base and consisted of 12 episodes. The series is composed and directed by Kō Matsuo while the characters are designed by Kumi Ishii in reference to the original characters drawn by Yamato Yamamoto. The series started airing in Japan on Chiba TV and TV Kanagawa on April 3, 2008 and ended its run on June 19, 2008.

Three pieces of theme music are used, one opening theme and two ending themes. The opening theme, "Love Jump" is performed by Minami Kuribayashi, while the ending themes, "Crossing Day" (Eps 1 - 7, 9 - 11) and "Tenohira no Taiyou 「手のひらの太陽」" (Ep 8) both performed by Ryoko Shintani, the voice actress of Yūno Hōzuki in the series.

Episode Listings

OVA episodes
This episode list details the Kure-nai OVAs, which are more faithful to the manga and novels.

References

External links
Light novel official website series 
Manga official website 
Anime official website 

 ANN review

Kure-nai